, who is also known as  is a fictional character from SNK's The King of Fighters series of fighting video games. Leona is Heidern's adopted daughter, who is introduced in The King of Fighters '96; she replaces him because he accepts a more active role behind the scenes. The character has also appeared in multiple spin-off games and other media, some of which also feature her Orochi form.

Leona was created by SNK to replace Heidern, her superior in the story; she had an integral role in the games' narrative form previously seen in her debut game. She is SNK's response to Street Fighter character Cammy. Leona's design was intended to contrast with previous SNK heroines, which led to her silent personality. Her design was given variations; her The King of Fighters XIV design expands her sex appeal. Leona has been voiced by Masae Yumi and Seiko Yoshida.

Critical reception to Leona's character has been mostly positive, with journalists enjoying her backstory, movesets and her Orochi form. This has led to criticism of her removal from The King of Fighters XI because of her popularity.

Creation and design

Leona Heidern debuted in The King of Fighters (KOF) series in The King of Fighters '96 (KOF '96) as a replacement for Heidern. The game's designers created the plot element of Heidern's adopted daughter before the production of KOF '96. The details of her origins gradually came to include a crucial role as a descendant of the Orochi tribe. Leona's special moves were designed to be unique and reveal the tastes of her designers. SNK noted there were multiple conceptions that Leona's complete name is Leona Heidern as a result of being under Heidern's care but they said it is just a codename and her only name is Leona.

Shinkiro, an illustrator who worked on The King of Fighters, considered Leona with her "ice queen" persona an opposite of Mai Shiranui, another popular female character featured in the series. SNK artist Falcoon stated Leona is the company's response to Street Fighter character Cammy; both of whom are implosion assassins. While never used for fights, SNK provided Leona with a secretary outfit Falcoon found stylish. Fellow Ikari Team member Whip was originally meant to be introduced in KOF '96 but the importance of Leona in the story led to her inclusion until The King of Fighters '99. Leona's and Whip's designs were meant to contrast one another. Character designer Nao Q also named Leona as his favorite character; he comments on his fondness for ice maidens.

Leona's design has been altered since her debut; Falcoon gave her an alternative skin in Maximum Impact 2, in which she wears Heidern's clothing, including her eyepatch. Another outfit is a reference to Neon Genesis Evangelion character Rei Ayanami. Her most recent design was done by Eisuke Ogura for The King of Fighters XIV. Nobuyuki Kuroki comments on Leona's chest being more robust compared to her previous incarnations. The King of Fighters XIV producer Yasuyuki Oda states Leona and Kyo Kusanagi are his favorite characters in The King of Fighters series. Oda said "Leona’s character is reticent and she does not show so much charm. But I think that makes her cool. During her dash, you can charge her attack and I love it. The sharp sound effect when she performs her Moon Slasher is the best." 
For the spinoff game SNK Heroines: Tag Team Frenzy, Oda recommended Leona alongside Yuri Sakazaki as playable characters for newcomers. Oda added that Leona's characterization was meant to make the story of the spin-off more comical as a result of her stoic traits that make her unaffected by wearing skimpy clothing in contrast to the rest members from the cast like Mai. Manga author Kyotaro Azuma has come to enjoy drawing the character across serialization of the manga A New Beginning.

The popularity of Iori Yagami's berserker form first seen in his ending from the same game inspired the idea of Leona entering into her own alter ego. The team liked this form and added multiple aspects to her introductions that would make both Orochi Leona and Orochi Iori appear threatening in The King of Fighters '97, in which Leona is revealed in the arcade run. Then character has been voiced by Masae Yumi and Seiko Yoshida.

Appearances
Leona makes her debut in SNK's KOF '96 as a new member of the Ikari Team alongside her superiors Clark Still and Ralf Jones. As a child, Leona was cursed by a priest named Goenitz with Orochi's curse, which is also known as the Riot of the Blood. The curse caused her to murder several people, including her own family. In the next game, KOF '97, Leona's curse causes her to become a boss character if she is not used by the player. Following her and the demon Orochi's defeat, Leona regrets her actions and attempts to end her life but Ralf stops her. Leona is a playable character in all of the KOF games; her Orochi form returns in the remake of The King of Fighters '98 (Ultimate Match) and as an assistant character in The King of Fighters 2000.

Leona is playable in KOF '99, KOF 2000 and KOF 2001, in which she investigates the NESTS cartel. Leona is also playable in the 2002 installment, though there is no narrative in this title. In KOF 2003, Leona loses control over her inner demon, and beats up Ralf and Clark. This causes her to retire from the tournament The King of Fighters XI, and tries to control her power until KOF XIII and KOF XIV, when she returns to the tournament. In KOF XIII she overcomes the Orochi. In KOF XIV, it is said the revival of multiple individuals means the curse might come back but Leona feels she has defeated it thanks to her friends.

Leona has also appeared in spinoff games. Both King of Fighters R-1 and King of Fighters R-2 feature Leona and her berserker form as playable characters; the latter game includes her as a teamless character. The King of Fighters: Maximum Impact and Maximum Impact 2 investigating the whereabouts of a doctor. She is also present in the storyless game The King of Fighters: Neowave and The King of Fighters EX2. Leona is also present in spinoff games SNK Gals' Fighters and SNK Heroines: Tag Team Frenzy. In her ending in SNK Heroines, Leona has a nightmare in which her Orochi powers force her to defeat all of her allies. She also appeared as a playable skin in Mobile Legends: Bang Bang as a collaboration with SNK. In the crossover SNK vs. Capcom: The Match of the Millennium and appeared as a guest in Metal Slug XX.

Other games that include Leona and her Orochi form include The King of Fighters All Star, Kimi wa Hero and The King of Fighters '98 Ultimate Match Online. She also appears in the action-shooting cellphone game Ikari - Leona Gekitohen alongside Ralf and Clark, as well as The King of Fighters: Destiny. However, she is unplayable and simply a cameo characters in the visual novel Days of Memories.

Besides games, Leona has appeared in the manga The King of Fighters: Kyo during a mission that was also adapted into a visual novel in which the player, in control of Kyo Kusanagi, meets Leona and can recruit her into his team. She also appears in the manga The King of Fighters G, in which she reprises her role from KOF '96. In the manga The King of Fighters: A New Beginning, Leona suffers from the Riot of the Blood curse but is able to control it when facing former NESTS agent Angel. She makes a brief appearance in The King of Fighters: Another Day, investigating K' and Maxima's actions.

Reception
Leona's character has been well received by gamers in Japan. In the Neo Geo Freak's 1997 Volume 8 character poll, she was voted as the fourth favourite character 1,458 votes, composed of 187 votes from male fans and 1,271 votes from female fans. In Neo Geo Freak's August 1998 issue, she was ranked as the 2nd best character.

Critics have commented on Leona's traits and movements. Hard Core Gaming101 regarded Leona as one of the most suitable additions to the franchise in KOF '96 due to the way she mimics Heidern's techniques but at the same form is overpowered. The handling of her techniques was noted to be balanced across the series. ThunderBoltGames liked the character's introduction and said her fighting style is one of the most notable changes from KOF '96. UveJuegos enjoyed the character, noting despite replacing Heidern her character became popular with gamers due to her role in the narrative. DieHardGameFan's Alex Lucard found the idea of Leona being related to the Orochi clan weird in the early games of the series. The removal of blood from her attacks in the English versions of KOF 2000, KOF 2001 and the first Maximum Impact drew negative comments from IGN because it removed elements that made Leona's combos appealing.

The character's absence from KOF XI received criticism because of her popularity. Her return in KOF XII was well received. Den of Geek compared Leona with the ideal child of the superheroes Hulk and Black Widow because of their similarities in abilities and their constant struggle to control their inner rage. The same site listed Leona as the eighth-best KOF fighter, praising her because despite her traumatic past, she is able to form bonds with the other members from the Ikari Team while exploring the fighting style. Destructoid labeled her as "Best Video Game Character of All Time". Famitsu regarded Leona as one of the characters who had the most natural transition to 3D in KOF XIV , noting her sex appeal stands out. Oda agreed, stating this was done because of her simple silhouette.

Den of Geek listed the Orochi forms of Leona and Iori were listed as the sixth-best altered video game characters based on their impact on the storyline. UveJuegos compared Leona's alter ego with those of Ryu, Akuma and Sakura Kasugano from Street Fighter Alpha 3 based on their parallels. Meristation compared Orochi Leona to a wild animal due to her aggression in this form and said the character's background and relationship with the clan are too gruesome. The character's use in All Star was recommended by LevelWinner due to her statistics.

References

Female characters in anime and manga
Female characters in video games
Fictional female martial artists
Fictional martial artists in video games
Fictional mercenaries in video games
Fictional soldiers in video games
The King of Fighters characters
SNK protagonists
Video game characters introduced in 1996
Woman soldier and warrior characters in video games